Electrography often refers to electrophotography, that is, Kirlian photography. 

Electrography may also refer to: 

 Measurement and recording of electrophysiologic activity for diagnostic purposes
 Electrocardiography (ECG or EKG), electrography of heart electrical activity and rhythm
 Electromyography (EMG), electrography of other muscle action potentials throughout the body
 Electroencephalography (EEG), electrography of brain waves (from outside the skull)
 Electrocorticography or intracranial EEG (iEEG or ECoG), EEG with direct contact to the cerebral cortex
 Electrooculography (EOG), electrography of intraocular potential differences
 Electroolfactography (EOG), electrography of olfaction (smell)
 Electroretinography (ERG), electrography of retinal cell action potentials
 Electronystagmography (ENG), electrography of eye muscle movements
 Electrocochleography (ECOG), electrography of cochlear auditory activity
 Electroantennography (EAG), electrography of insect antennae olfaction
 Electrogastrography (EGG), electrography of stomach smooth muscle
 Electrogastroenterogram (EGEG), electrography of stomach and bowel smooth muscle
 Electroglottography (EGG), electrography of glottal movement
 Electropalatography (EPG), electrography of palatal contact of the tongue
 Some kinds of electrical brain stimulation (EBS)